The thirteenth series of the British television drama The Bill was broadcast from 2 January to 30 December 1997. The series consisted of 152 episodes, including three-hour-long specials. There were just two cast departures in the series after four the year before; actor Tom Butcher left the role of PC Steve Loxton after seven years on the show, however he would return in two episodes in 1999 as a guest at Dave Quinnan's wedding. The other departure was that of Alan Westaway, who left his role of PC Nick Slater after two and a half years. Their characters were replaced by PCs Luke Ashton and Sam Harker, with actors Scott Neal and Matthew Crompton appearing as guest actors on a number of times, both of the actor's most recent guest stints coming the previous year. The series also saw DC Tom Proctor, introduced into CID. Actor Gregory Donaldson revealed in a 2018 interview on The Bill Podcast that the role came after impressing producers in a guest stint earlier in the series, portraying burglary suspect Andy Melford in an hour-long special, "In the Dark". 

On 3 April 2013 the complete series was released as a two-part region-free DVD box set in Australia. The DVD artwork depicts DSs Don Beech (Billy Murray) and John Boulton (Russell Boulter).

Cast

Arrivals
 DC Tom Proctor ("Foxed")
 PC Luke Ashton ("Potential For Conflict")
 PC Sam Harker ("Things That Go Bump in the Night")

Departures
 PC Nick Slater ("Free to Speak?") - Transfers to SO10
 PC Steve Loxton ("No Trace") - Resigns after being angered by a complaint about his old school methods

Episodes
{| class="wikitable plainrowheaders" style="width:100%; margin:auto; background:#FFFFFF;"
|-style="color:black"
! style="background-color:#BB66FF;" width="20"|#
! style="background-color:#BB66FF;" width="150"|Title
! style="background-color:#BB66FF;" width="230"|Episode notes
! style="background-color:#BB66FF;" width="140"|Directed by
! style="background-color:#BB66FF;" width="150"|Written by
! style="background-color:#BB66FF;" width="100"|Original air date

|}

1997 British television seasons
The Bill series